Bad Kleinkirchheim is a municipality and spa town in the district of Spittal an der Drau, in Carinthia, Austria.

Until the middle of the 20th century, agriculture was the dominant focus, but it is now a renowned spa and ski resort. Although records show people appreciating the area as a recreation area as early as the 11th century, and the first bathing guests arriving in the 17th century, it was only in the last few decades that Bad Kleinkirchheim began to move away from agriculture and focus on its potential for tourism.

Geography

Location
North of Kleinkirchheim and St. Oswald, part of the Nockberge National Park is within the area’s boundaries.

Bad Kleinkirchheim also borders Krems in the northwest and Feld am See to the southwest.

Municipal arrangement
Bad Kleinkirchheim is divided into 3 Katastralgemeinden: Kleinkirchheim, Sankt Oswald, and Zirkitzen. It can be further divided into nine Ortschaften:
{| border="1" cellpadding="2" cellspacing="0" textalign="right" style="margin-left:1em;font-size: 95%" "
|---- bgcolor="#CCCCCC"
! colspan="1" align="center" |Kleinkirchheim ||colspan="1" align="center" |Sankt Oswald 
|colspan="1" align="center" |Zirkitzen 
|---- bgcolor="#FFFFFF"
| Aigen (population: 57) || Sankt Oswald (168) || Rottenstein (99) 
|---- bgcolor="#FFFFFF"
| Bach (302) || Staudach (167) || Zirkitzen (418)
|---- bgcolor="#FFFFFF"
| Kleinkirchheim (357) ||   ||   
|---- bgcolor="#FFFFFF"
| Obertschern (127) ||   ||   
|---- bgcolor="#FFFFFF"
| Unterschern (168) ||   ||   
|}

History 

The remote and densely forested valley apparently was not settled in Roman times, when the area became part of the Noricum province in 15 BC. From about 600, Alpine Slavs migrated up the Drava and its tributary valleys, followed by Bavarian settlers from the mid 8th century onwards. In the early 9th century, the region passed under Carolingian suzerainty. Part of the Imperial Duchy of Carinthia from 976, the Kleinkirchheim estates were held by the Bavarian Aribonid dynasty.

In a document dated 5 July 1166, in which Archbishop Conrad II of Salzburg confirms the donation of a chapel in the area to nearby Millstatt Abbey, there is mention of Chirchem as well as of a priest called Pabo. This is considered the first mention of Bad Kleinkirchheim. The settlement is also mentioned in a 1177 deed issued by Pope Alexander III. The Benedictine monks had the forests cleared and the valley colonized by smallholder peasants. The settlement was later called Kleinkirchheim in order to distinguish it from Großkirchheim in the Carinthian Möll Valley.

In 1469 Millstatt Abbey was dissolved and its estates passed to the Knightly Order of Saint George, established by Emperor Frederick III to protect the area against the Ottoman forces who after the Fall of Constantinople already campaigned the Balkans and the Duchy of Carniola in the south. Turkish troops broke into the region in September 1473, robbing the town and plundering the valleys. On 25 June 1478 a group of about 600 farmers tried unsuccessfully to drive them out. By 1480 the Turks left, possibly as a result of an invasion by Hungarians under King Matthias Corvinus.

During the Protestant Reformation, many farmers in the area turned Lutheran and by the late 16th century freedom of religion had been bestowed on the residents. However, when the Habsburg archduke Ferdinand II rose to power, he ceded the Millstatt estates with Kleinkirchheim to the Jesuits and made Roman Catholicism the official religion. Nevertheless, Crypto-Protestants still managed to smuggle books and hold secret meetings during the Counter-Reformation, and according to the 1781 Patent of Toleration issued by Emperor Joseph II, a Protestant or a Jew would have nearly all the rights of a Catholic.

Bad Kleinkirchheim was shortly ruled within the French Illyrian Provinces during the Napoleonic Wars, but returned to the Austrian Empire in 1816. The Revolutions of 1848 also affected the area, as farmers (which then made up most of the town's population) got more rights.

Finally, in 1973, Bad Kleinkirchheim officially had the "Bad" (bath, spa) attached to its name, Kleinkirchheim, a reference to the popular hot spring.

Population

93.4% of the inhabitants of Bad Kleinkirchheim are Austrian by nationality. The largest portion of the foreign population comes from South-East Europe (Yugoslavia 1.7%, Croatia 1.0%, Bosnia and Herzegovina 0.5%) as well as from Germany (1.4%). 95.2% of the population speak German, 1.8% Serbian and 1.0% Croatian. 62.3% of the population admit themselves to Roman Catholicism, 30.8% are Protestants and 2.0% Orthodox, 0.8% are Muslims, 3.5% are without religious confession.

Buildings 
This town is most famous for its church, built circa 1492. There are also many farms and mills.

Sports 
The town is known for its ski resorts, offering skiable slopes of 185 km, as well as 16 km of tracks for cross-country skiing. The Alpine Skiing World Cup is also held here often. The local ski club, the Ski Club Kleinkirchheim, was established in 1947 and has about 2,000 members, a population larger than the town itself.

Besides skiing, other less popular sports include football, golf, and tennis. The town also has a chess club.

Politics 
The Mayor of the town is Matthias Krenn (FPK). The local council consists of 15 members. Of those members, 7 are FPK, 4 SPÖ, 3 ÖVP, and the last is independent.

References

External links 

 A guide to skiing in Bad Kleinkichheim
Alpine Ski Winners in Bad Kleinkirchheim

Cities and towns in Spittal an der Drau District
Spa towns in Austria
Ski areas and resorts in Austria